Sigmund Fraenkel or Sigmund Fränkel (22 May 1868, in Krakau – 7 June 1939, in Geneva) was a Polish-born chemist who lived and worked in Austria, and is notable for being the head of the Ludwig-Spiegler-Stiftung in Vienna from 1904 and his work in the field of Physiological chemistry, notably on the chemistry of the thyroid gland. He studied at the University of Vienna under Ernst Ludwig (1842-1915) and Ernst Wilhelm von Brücke, in Prague under Karl Hugo Huppert (1832–1904) and in Freiburg im Breisgau. In 1892 he obtained his doctorate in medicine in Vienna, and in 1896 he was Private Tutor in Medicinal chemistry.

Works
 Die Arzneimittel-Synthese auf Grundlage der Beziehungen zwischen chemischen Aufbau und Wirkung : für Ärzte, Chemiker und Pharmazeuten . Springer, Berlin 3rd ed. 1912 Digital edition by the University and State Library Düsseldorf

References

Publications
Über neue Cholesterin-Derivate – Sigmund Fränkel & Paul Dombacher (May 1927)

Austrian chemists
Austrian biochemists
University of Vienna alumni
1868 births
1939 deaths
Scientists from Kraków
Polish emigrants to Austria